Salem Rashid Obaid Sanad Rashid (Arabic:سالم راشد عبيد سند راشد; born 21 December 1993) is an Emirati professional footballer. He currently plays for Al Jazira.

References

External links
 
 

Emirati footballers
1993 births
Living people
Al-Ittihad Kalba SC players
Al Jazira Club players
UAE First Division League players
UAE Pro League players
Association football defenders
Association football midfielders
Footballers at the 2014 Asian Games
Asian Games competitors for the United Arab Emirates